Periechocrinus is an extinct genus of crinoids belonging to the order Monobathrida, family Periechecrinidae.

These stationary upper-level epifaunal suspension feeders lived during the Carboniferous period and the Mississippian age of Australia, as well as in the Silurian of Canada, Czech Republic, United Kingdom and United States, from 436.0 to 345.3 Ma.

Species
Periechocrinus costatus (Austin and Austin)
Periechocrinus indicator Etheridge Jr. 1892

Description

References

External links
 Museum of Victoria

Monobathrida
Extinct animals of Australia
Carboniferous crinoids
Paleozoic life of Ontario